Castellers de Sydney is a human tower organisation based on Sydney, Australia. Human towers is a Catalan tradition that started in the South of Catalonia 300 years ago.

Traditionally there were teams only in Catalonia but recently other formations have been founded in other locations such as London, Chile, China, Paris, Melbourne, Sydney and others.

Even though Castellers of Sydney have many Catalan members it also have members from different nationalities such as American, French, German, Australian among others.

History 

Sydney human towers started their activity on 24 June 2016, building for the first time in Sydney a pillar of three, that consisted of three levels, one person on top of another. This was the first time the team performed in public, retaining this date as their anniversary.

After this first public event they started rehearsing periodically every Thursday at 6pm at Hyde Park, gathering the attention of the Australian public and giving them the opportunity to know about the Catalan tradition and even experience it first hand by participating in the building of the human tower.

The team has been improving periodically completing the 3of5, 4of5, pillar of 4 and 4of5 with a needle (a pillar inside the structure of 4) and 2of5 in this order, certifying not only a growth in members but also a technical growth completing more difficult towers every time.

For their first anniversary the team tried for the very first time a 4of6, that was unloaded just before the "anxaneta", the kid at the top reached the top.

Finally, on 10 September and celebrating the Catalan National Day in an event organised by "Casal Català de NSW" (Catalan Association of New South Wales) they completed the first towers of 6 levels in Oceania, making this the most remote tower in Human Towers history.

In another performance on 17 February (and also organised by the Catalan Association of New South Wales) they completed the first full performance in Oceania with the collaboration of the Melbourne team, Koalas of Melbourne. A human towers full performance implies at least 3 towers of 6 or more and a pillar of 4. 
They completed it by completing a 3of6, 4of6 and 4of6 with the pillar. This is, until the date, the best performance ever done in Oceania.

References 

Castellers
Organisations based in Sydney